Leo Pinto (11 April 1914 – 10 August 2010) was a field hockey goalkeeper from India, who won the gold medal with the India national team at the 1948 Summer Olympics in London. During the peak of his playing days, he was rated among the best goalkeepers in the world.

Early life
Pinto was born as Leo Hillary Knowles Pinto on 11 April 1914, in Nairobi, East Africa (now in Kenya). His wife's name was Jenny Pinto. He was born to a family of Portuguese descent, with their roots in Goa, India. Pinto's family moved to Bombay (now Mumbai) when he was eight. He attended the St. Stanisalus school in Bombay and graduated in 1932, before joining the Antonio D'Souza High School in Byculla, Bombay. He played hockey, football and cricket as a kid. He, however took up hockey seriously at the age of 13, and as a goalkeeper.

Career
Pinto, as a professional played his first matches in the Aga Khan Tournament with the Byculla Rovers club, at a young age. As a student of the St. Xavier's College, Mumbai, he represented the college in inter-collegiate tournaments along with his future colleagues in Indian senior national team, Owen Ferreira, Willie Fernandes and Owen Pinto. At the club level, he also played for Lusitanians Hockey Club and the Tata Sports Club. For the latter club, he played for 27 years in a row and his career in club hockey lasted for 35 years.

Playing for the Indian senior team, Pinto was to make his debut in Olympic Games, at the 1936 Olympics in Berlin. But, a serious concussion sustained at one of the final trial matches ruled him out of the Games. However, he made his debut at the 1948 Olympics in London, with the team winning the gold medal. He played in three of India's five matches at the Games and conceded just one goal. In the final against Great Britain, he scored India's last and final goal in a penalty, thus having the distinction of one of the very few goalkeepers to score a goal.

Later years and death
Following his career in hockey, Pinto became a coach and a member of the national selection committee of the Indian team that won the bronze medal at the 1972 Olympics in Munich. He was also associated with the Bombay Hockey Association in the 1970s. He died in his residence in Mumbai on 10 August 2010.

References

External links
 
 Bharatiya Hockey

1914 births
2010 deaths
Field hockey players at the 1948 Summer Olympics
Indian male field hockey players
Field hockey players from Goa
Indian field hockey coaches
Indian Roman Catholics
Olympic field hockey players of India
Olympic gold medalists for India
Olympic medalists in field hockey
Medalists at the 1948 Summer Olympics
Sportspeople from Nairobi
Kenyan people of Indian descent
Kenyan people of Goan descent
Kenyan emigrants to India